The Iberoamerican University of Science and Technology  or UIBERO (in the past UNICIT) is a private university Chilean accredited by the National Commission of Accreditation (CNA-Chile). It finds  situated in the city of Santiago of Chile.

In 2016, the ránking of AméricaEconomía situated it in the 47th place of a total of 57 universities considered, whereas the ránking Webometrics situated it in the place 74th place of a total of 79 Chilean universities considered.

History 
The university was founded on 17 April 1989, by the professor normalista, graduate in education of the Catholic University of Chile and employer Filomena Narváez Elgueta.

On 1 April 1991, the Ministry of Education authorises the careers of Agronomy, Veterinary Medicine, Engineering in Foods, Commercial Engineering, Civil Engineering in Electronics, Forest Engineering and Contador Auditor. During this first stage, the university was examined by the University Austral, University of Concepción and University of Talca, explaining ademas with the support of the University of Tennessee.

In June 1996 created  the magazine Witnesses University like space of opinion, discussion and diffusion of the institution.

In April 1998 inaugurated  the building Tennessee, central headquarters of the university, where concentrate  laboratories, rooms of classes and administrative units of the institution.

On 15 January 2004, after the presentation in front of the Upper Council of Education, delivered  the status of Autonomous University.

In 2005, the National Commission of Accreditation, accredited to the University in the Areas of Institutional Management and Teaching of Pregrado by a valid term until 28 January 2011.

In December 2013, during the retoría of Sergio Becerra Ovalle, the house of studies lost the accreditation when the National Commission of Accreditation dictated his last institutional certifications of the year.

On 13 January 2016, the university signs an agreement with the Private University San Juan Bautista of Peru.

Rectors 
The rectors from his foundation until the day of today have been the following:

Professors stood out 
 Iván Palavicino Hernández ːEx Dean of the Faculty of Natural Resources and Sciences Silvoagropecuarias and educational of bovine medicine.
 Walter Von Frey: Educational of reproduction, gynaecology and veterinary obstetrics.
 Frederick Ahumada: Ex Dean of the Faculty of Natural Resources and Sciences Silvoagropecuarias and educational of veterinary pharmacology.
 Roberto Parada Navarro: Ex Director of the School of Veterinary and educational Medicine of toxicology and animal physiology.

Organisation 
The university organises  around five academic faculties.

See also 
 Annex:Universities of Chile

References 

Organizations established in 1989
Universities in Santiago Metropolitan Region